Cartier Alexander Martin (born November 20, 1984) is an American former professional basketball player who played seven seasons in the National Basketball Association (NBA). He played college basketball for Kansas State.

College career
He spent his college career at Kansas State University and is one of the top all-time scoring leaders at the school.  His first three seasons he was coached by Jim Wooldridge and his senior year he was coached by Bob Huggins.

Professional career
After his senior season, he entered the 2007 NBA Draft but went undrafted. In his first professional year, he went overseas to play for the Turkish Basketball League's Antalya Büyükşehir Belediyesi. After one season in Europe, he was selected in the first round (15th pick overall) of the 2008 NBA Development League Draft by the Iowa Energy.

On January 29, 2009, he was signed to a 10-day contract by the Charlotte Bobcats, having averaged 20.6 points per game in 21 games with the Iowa Energy. He was named to the 2009 D-League All-Star Game, although he did not compete owing to his status with the Bobcats.

He was signed by the Bobcats to a second 10-day contract on February 8, and then signed for the rest of the season on February 18, 2009.

In July 2009, he was signed by the Italian league outfit Benetton Treviso to a 2-year contract. He returned to the Iowa Energy in December 2009.

On January 10, 2010, Martin was signed to a 10-day contract by the Golden State Warriors. After his second 10-day expired, he returned to the Iowa Energy of the NBA D-League. On March 30, Martin signed a 10-day contract with the Washington Wizards. On April 9, he signed with the Wizards for the rest of their season.

In August 2010, Martin was invited by the Wizards to their training camp for the 2010–11 season. On April 6, 2011, he was waived by the Wizards. On July 10, he signed with Jilin Northeast Tigers of the Chinese Basketball Association.

After playing in China, Martin returned to the Iowa Energy on March 4, 2012. On March 28, he was signed by the Wizards on a 10-day contract.

On July 12, 2012, Martin re-signed with the Wizards.

On October 15, 2013, he signed with the Atlanta Hawks. On January 7, 2014, he was waived by the Hawks. In 25 games, he averaged 6.6 points per game. On January 10, he signed a 10-day contract with the Chicago Bulls. On January 20, he signed a second 10-day contract with the Bulls. He was subsequently not signed for the rest of season after his second 10-day contract expired. On February 1, Martin signed a 10-day contract with the Atlanta Hawks. On February 11, he signed a second 10-day contract with the Hawks. On February 21, he signed with the Hawks for the rest of the season.

On August 18, 2014, Martin signed with the Detroit Pistons. In 23 games during the 2014–15 season with Detroit, Martin averaged 1.6 points, 0.9 rebounds and 0.5 assists in 8.6 minutes per game. On June 1, 2015, he exercised his player option for the 2015–16 season with the Pistons worth $1.27 million. On October 23, 2015, he was waived by the Pistons. On October 31, he was selected by the Iowa Energy with the fourth overall pick in the 2015 NBA Development League draft. On January 12, 2016, he was waived by Iowa.

On October 29, 2016, Martin was reacquired by the Iowa Energy. On March 17, 2017, Martin was waived by the Energy. Three days later, he was acquired by the Windy City Bulls.

The Basketball Tournament (TBT) (2017–present) 

In the summer of 2017, Martin played in The Basketball Tournament on ESPN for The Stickmen. He competed for the $2 million prize, and for The Stickmen, he averaged 16.5 points per game and 7.5 rebounds per game. Martin helped take The Stickmen to the second round of the tournament, where they then lost to Team Challenge ALS 87-73.

NBA career statistics

Regular season

|-
| align="left" | 
| align="left" | Charlotte
| 33 || 1 || 8.1 || .364 || .303 || .800 || 1.0 || .4 || .2 || .1 || 2.6
|-
| align="left" | 
| align="left" | Golden State
| 10 || 2 || 27.6 || .364 || .323 || .762 || 4.7 || .9 || .8 || .0 || 9.0
|-
| align="left" | 
| align="left" | Washington
| 8 || 0 || 14.3 || .375 || .389 || .889 || 2.6 || .9 || .4 || .1 || 6.4
|-
| align="left" | 
| align="left" | Washington
| 52 || 1 || 10.4 || .390 || .394 || .700 || 1.4 || .3 || .3 || .1 || 4.0
|-
| align="left" | 
| align="left" | Washington
| 17 || 2 || 23.0 || .440 || .387 || .579 || 3.4 || .6 || .6 || .1 || 9.3
|-
| align="left" | 
| align="left" | Washington
| 41 || 3 || 16.9 || .381 || .397 || .714 || 2.4 || .5 || .5 || .1 || 6.6
|-
| align="left" | 
| align="left" | Atlanta
| 53 || 6 || 15.5 || .414 || .384 || .754 || 2.0 || .6 || .5 || .1 || 5.9
|-
| align="left" | 
| align="left" | Chicago
| 6 || 0 || 8.0 || .625 || .600 || .500 || .8 || .3 || .2 || .0 || 2.5
|-
| align="left" | 
| align="left" | Detroit
| 23 || 0 || 8.6 || .283 || .182 || .000 || .9 || .5 || .1 || .0 || 1.6
|-
| align="left" | Career
| align="left" | 
| 243 || 15 || 13.8 || .392 || .372 || .729 || 1.9 || .5 || .4 || .1 || 5.1

Playoffs

|-
| style="text-align:left;"| 2014
| style="text-align:left;"| Atlanta
| 3 || 0 || 15.0 || .667 || .000 || .000 || 3.0 || 0.0 || 2.0 || 0.0 || 4.0
|-
| style="text-align:left;"| Career
| style="text-align:left;"| 
| 3 || 0 || 15.0 || .667 || .000 || .000 || 3.0 || 0.0 || 2.0 || 0.0 || 4.0

Personal life
In 2011, it was reported that Martin had lost $374,000 in a ponzi scheme.

References

External links
 
 NBA.com Draft Profile
 TBLStat.net Profile

1984 births
Living people
African-American basketball players
American expatriate basketball people in China
American expatriate basketball people in Italy
American expatriate basketball people in Turkey
American men's basketball players
Antalya Büyükşehir Belediyesi players
Atlanta Hawks players
Basketball players from Texas
Charlotte Bobcats players
Chicago Bulls players
Detroit Pistons players
Golden State Warriors players
Iowa Energy players
Kansas State Wildcats men's basketball players
Pallacanestro Treviso players
Parade High School All-Americans (boys' basketball)
People from Crockett, Texas
San-en NeoPhoenix players
Shooting guards
Small forwards
Undrafted National Basketball Association players
Washington Wizards players
Windy City Bulls players
21st-century African-American sportspeople
20th-century African-American people